Jonathan Richardson or Johnathan Richardson, the Elder (1667–1745) was an English artist.

Jonathan Richardson may also refer to:

Jonathan Richardson (MP) (b. 1804), Irish politician
Jonathan Joseph Richardson (d. 1876), Irish politician
Jonathan Richardson the Younger, painter, son of artist Jonathan Richardson
Jonathan Richardson, 2011 winner of the motorcycle trial Scott Trial

See also
Jon Richardson (disambiguation)
John Richardson (disambiguation)